Lycium fremontii is a species of flowering plant in the nightshade family, Solanaceae, that is native to northwestern Mexico and the southernmost mountains and deserts of California and Arizona in the United States. It often grows in areas with alkaline soils, such as alkali flats.

Both its common name, Frémont's desert thorn, and its specific epithet, "fremontii", are derived from John C. Frémont.

Description
Parts of the plant are coated in glandular hairs.

The flower is light to deep purple with purple veining. The corolla is a narrow tube opening into usually five lobes.

References

External links
Jepson Manual Treatment - Lycium fremontii
Lycium fremontii - Photo gallery

fremontii
Flora of Northwestern Mexico
Flora of the California desert regions
Flora of the Sonoran Deserts
Flora of Baja California
Flora of New Mexico
Flora of Arizona
Natural history of the Colorado Desert
Natural history of the Peninsular Ranges
Taxa named by Asa Gray
Flora without expected TNC conservation status